Démophon is a French-language opera by the composer Johann Christoph Vogel, first performed at the Académie Royale de Musique (the Paris Opera) on 15 September 1789. The libretto is by Philippe Desriaux. The second and last of Vogel's operas to be staged, it was premiered after the composer's death at the age of 32 the previous year.

Roles

References
Notes

Sources
Original libretto and score at Gallica - Bibliothèque Nationale de France

Operas
French-language operas
1789 operas
Operas by Johann Christoph Vogel